The asrai is a type of aquatic fairy in English folklore and literature. They are usually depicted as female, live in lakes and are similar to the mermaid and nixie.

Etymology and origin 

The etymology of the word "asrai" is unknown. "Ashray" is sometimes given as a spelling variant. Their oldest known appearance in print was the poem "The Asrai" by Robert Williams Buchanan, first published in April 1872, and followed by a sequel, "The Changeling: A Legend of the Moonlight." The first person to describe the asrai as a folkloric being was the storyteller Ruth Tongue, whose reliability as a folklorist has been questioned.

Characteristics 

In Buchanan's poetry, the asrai are pale, gentle beings, older than humanity, who fear sunlight and live beneath Bala Lake in Wales. His poem "The Changeling" features a male asrai who inhabits a human body, becoming a changeling in search of an immortal soul.

Ruth Tongue later collected tales from Cheshire and Shropshire of asrai which live for hundreds of years and come up to the surface of the water once each century to bathe in the moonlight, which they use to help them grow. The Cheshire and Shropshire stories tell of a fisherman who captured an asrai and put it in his boat. It seemed to plead for its freedom in an unknown language, and when the fisherman bound it the touch of its cold wet hands burned his skin like fire, leaving a permanent mark. He covered the asrai with wet weeds, and it continued to protest, its voice getting fainter and fainter. By the time the fisherman reached the shore the asrai had melted away leaving nothing but a puddle of water in the boat, for the asrai perish if directly exposed too long to the sun.   Their inability to survive daylight is similar to that of trolls from Scandinavian folklore. 

In some retellings, the asrai has green hair and a fishtail instead of legs, or webbed feet instead. In a retelling by Rosalind Kerven, if the asrai sees a man she will attempt to lure him with promises of gold and jewels into the deepest part of the lake to drown or simply to trick him. However, she cannot tolerate human coarseness and vulgarity, and this will be enough to frighten her away. This tale had previously been told of a Shropshire mermaid, without the term asrai.

See also

Fuath
Glaistig
Kelpie
Melusine
Morgan le Fay
Morgen
Naiad
Näkki
Nymph
Rusalka
Selkie
Siren
Undines

Links

 The Changeling: A Legend of the Moonlight

References

English legendary creatures
Fairies
Female legendary creatures
Water spirits